The 2018–19 Belgian Cup, called the Croky Cup for sponsorship reasons, was the 64th season of Belgium's annual football cup competition. The competition began on 29 July 2018 and ended with the final in May 2019. The winners of the competition qualify for the 2019–20 UEFA Europa League Group Stage. Standard Liège were the defending champions.

Competition format
The competition consists of ten rounds. Except for the semi-finals, all rounds are single-match elimination rounds. When tied after 90 minutes in the first three rounds, penalties are taken immediately. In rounds four to seven and the quarterfinals, when tied after 90 minutes first an extra time period of 30 minutes are played, then penalties are taken if still necessary. The semi-finals will be played over two legs, where the team winning on aggregate advances. The final will be played as a single match.

Teams enter the competition in different rounds, based upon their 2018–19 league affiliation. Teams from the fifth-level Belgian Third Amateur Division or lower began in round 1. Belgian Second Amateur Division teams entered in round 2, Belgian First Amateur Division teams entered in round 3, Belgian First Division B teams in round 5 and finally the Belgian First Division A teams enter in round 6.

Round and draw dates

First round
This round of matches is scheduled to be played on 28 & 29 July 2018 and includes teams playing in the Belgian Third Amateur Division and Belgian Provincial Leagues. Teams from the Belgian Third Amateur Division were seeded and could not play each other.

Notes

Second round

Notes

Third round

Fourth round

Fifth Round
Some fifth round ties were reversed as amateur teams (tiers 3 and below) automatically received home advantage in case they met the stadium requirements regarding seating, lighting and safety. Amateur teams are allowed to sell their home advantage.

Sixth Round
The draw for the sixth round was made on 28 August 2018 and included the 16 teams from the Belgian First Division A, which were all seeded and could not meet each other. All non-professional teams (division 3 and below) automatically received home advantage if their stadium had sufficient capacity and floodlight luminosity, which was the case for all teams except Duffel and Mandel United.

Seventh Round
The draw for the seventh round was made immediately after the last game of the sixth round, between Anderlecht and Union SG, was finished. Six teams outside the top division qualified for this round, with Mandel United from the Belgian Second Amateur Division the lowest still in the competition.

The matches will be played on 4, 5 and 6 December 2018.

Quarter-finals
The draw for the quarter-finals was made on 5 December 2018, with the matches were played on 18 and 19 December 2018. Both Mechelen and Union SG, the two remaining teams from outside the top division managed to qualify for the Semi-finals.

Semi-finals
The draw for the semi-finals was made on 19 December, after completion of the last matches of the quarter-finals. As the two teams remaining from the 2018–19 Belgian First Division B, Mechelen and Union SG, were drawn against each other, at least one team from outside the top division will play the final, which last happened in the 2001 Belgian Cup Final when Belgian Second Division champions Lommel lost to Westerlo.

The matches will be played on 23, 24, 29 and 30 January 2019.

First Legs

Second Legs

Final

The final took place on 1 May 2019 at the King Baudouin Stadium in Brussels.

References

Belgian Cup seasons
Belgian Cup
Cup